Óscar David Romero Villamayor (born 4 July 1992) is a Paraguayan professional footballer who plays as an attacking midfielder for Argentine Primera División club Boca Juniors and the Paraguay national team. He is the twin brother of Ángel Romero.

Career
Romero was in the youth ranks of Boca Juniors when he was a Sub 15, but could not continue at the club for a matter of paperwork, therefore he did not play for the Xeneize.

Club Cerro Porteño
Romero joined the youth ranks of Cerro Porteño at the age of 14. He debuted in the First Division of Paraguay on 15 May 2011 in a 1–0 defeat against General Caballero SC of Zeballos Cue. He scored his first goal on 1 December 2012 against Sportivo Luqueño. His good performances attracted many European teams, such as Spanish clubs Real Madrid B and Valencia Football Club.

In 2013, like his brother Angel, he had more opportunities, since the club decided to give chance to the youth. With the new DT Francisco Arce, Oscar impressed, attracting interest from clubs like Baniyas SC of United Arab Emirates and also being summoned to the Selection Paraguay.

In October 2014, after his good performances in the knockout round of the Copa Sudamericana against Lanús Argentina, in which he scored three goals, he was said to be worth $3 to 6 million. He was targeted by major European clubs, such as Atlético Madrid.

Racing Club
On 28 January 2015, Romero was signed by Racing Club for $2.7 million. He debuted on 18 February against Deportivo Tachira in Copa Libertadores. On 13 March 2015, Romero scored his first competitive goal for the club against Club Atlético Colón. On 15 August 2015, Romero scored his second goal against Union de Santa Fe.

Career statistics

Club
Statistics accurate as of match played 11 November 2018.

International goals
Scores and results list Paraguay's goal tally first.

Honours
Boca Juniors
Primera División: 2022
Copa de la Liga Profesional: 2022
Supercopa Argentina: 2022

References

External links
 
 
 Albirroja.ru profile
 

1992 births
Living people
r
r
r
r
r
r
r
r
r
r
r
r
r
r
r
r
r
r
r
r
People from Fernando de la Mora, Paraguay
Paraguayan twins
Twin sportspeople
Association football wingers
Association football forwards